Ures is a small city and a municipality in the Mexican state of Sonora.

Area
It has an area of 2,618.56 square kilometers. This is 1.41% of the total area of the state, and 0.13 percent of the national area of Mexico. Besides the seat, the most important localities are Guadalupe de Ures, San Pedro, Pueblo de Alamos and El Sauz.

Population
In the year 2000, the total population was 9,553 residents.  New figures from 2005 reported 8,420, meaning a considerable decline in population due to emigration.  The municipal seat had a population of 3,959 in 2000.

Physical and geographical facts
The municipality is in the basin of the Sonora River. As the river crosses the area, the river receives waters from Los Alamos, Bamuco, Nava, San Pedro, Cañada de Agua, and Los Cochis. Also, it receives runoff from washes as El Carrizo, Zuribate, Palo Parado, La Ladrillera, Santiago, and El Pescado. It has a reservoir that was recently built called Teópari.

The municipality is nestled within the mountains, hills, and valleys that form the edge of the Western Sierra Madre. The elevation of the administrative seat was 420 meters above sea level.

Climate
There are occasional frosts from December to March.

Vegetation
The vegetation is of mesquite and subtropical desert species.

Communications
A paved federal highway crosses the municipality from west to east.

History
Ures is one of the oldest cities of the state of Sonora. It was first reported by Cabeza de Vaca on his overland trek from Galveston in the 1530s and was called by him "Corazones", or "Village of Hearts". Coronado stopped there in the course of his 1540 expedition. It was founded in 1644 as a mission by the Jesuit missionary Francisco París, and was known as San Miguel de Ures until 1665. In 1823 Ures became the capital of Sonora, but was replaced the following year when Sonora was merged into Occidente State.

At the end of 1838, Ures became a city; and was the capital of Sonora from 1838 to 1842, and again from 1847 to 1879. Afterwards, it became the seat of a district.

During the Fall of the Second Mexican Empire in 1866, the Battle of Guadalupe took place within the municipality of Ures.  On September 5, 1998, the state legislature gave it the title of Heroic City, commemorating the liberal defense against imperialists. . Geronimo took refuge in the mountains of this region when generals Crook and Miles fought him in Arizona. The most notable Apache raids were in 1870, when the priest Echevería was killed in the town, and in 1882, when the distinguished scholar Leocadio Salcedo was killed at the La Noria ranch. Residents of the region also had problems with Yaqui uprisings and insurrections of the late 19th and early 20th centuries.

Tourism
In Ures you can visit “La Plaza de Armas(La Plaza de Zaragoza)” with its four 18th-century bronze sculptures, San Miguel Mission and the church bearing the same name with its legendary mesquite stairway. In addition, you will see the majestic arch commemorating the Independence and the house where General Pesqueira used to live, The Folkloric Museum, and the old Flour Mill.

Government

Municipal presidents

References

Sources consulted
Enciclopedia de los Municipios de Mexico
INEGI National statistics

External links
Ures, Ayuntamiento Digital (Official Website of Ures, Sonora)

Municipalities of Sonora
Populated places established in 1838
1838 establishments in Mexico